Glbus was a weekly political magazine in Macedonia. Currently the magazine operates with online edition.

References

External links
Globus magazine webpage (2007-2017)  

Defunct political magazines
Macedonian-language magazines
Magazines established in 2007
Magazines disestablished in 2009
Mass media in Skopje
Online magazines with defunct print editions